The Golden Mistress is a 1954 American adventure film directed by Abner Biberman and starring John Agar and Rosemarie Stack. It is set in Haiti, and deals with the search for a voodoo treasure.

Plot

Cast
John Agar as Bill Buchanan
Rosemarie Stack as Ann Dexter 
Jacques Molant as Ti Flute
André Narcisse as Iznard, Dombala Houngan
Abner Biberman	 as Carl Dexter
 André Contant as 	Dombala Soloist
Pierre Blain as 'Untamed' Houngan

External links
 
 

1954 films
1954 adventure films
Films directed by Abner Biberman
Films set in Haiti
United Artists films
Films scored by Raoul Kraushaar
American adventure films
1950s English-language films
1950s American films